Kyron is a masculine given name. Notable people with the name include:

Kyron Brown (born 1996), American football player
Kyron Cartwright (born 1996), American professional basketball player
Kyron Duke (born 1992), Welsh powerlifter
Kyron Farrell (born 1996), English footballer
Kyron Gordon (born 2002), English footballer
Kyron Hayden (born 1999), Australian rules footballer 
Kyron Horman (2002–??), American missing person
Kyron Johnson (born 1998), American football player
Kyron Lynch (born 1981), Trinidadian cricketer
Kyron McMaster (born 1997), British athlete
Kyron Stabana (born 1998), English footballer
Kyron Sullivan (born 1976), Welsh golfer

Masculine given names